Couples Therapy is an American television series on the Showtime network. The series was renewed for a second season, which premiered on April 18, 2021. An extended third season premiered on May 13, 2022. It was shown on BBC Two in the UK and is available to watch for free in the UK on the BBC's iPlayer service. The show was renewed for a fourth series which finished filming towards the end of 2022.

Overview 
Couples Therapy shows parts of the therapy sessions of three to four couples per season. The producers and therapist of the series wanted to show what a therapeutic process actually looks like. They didn't want to show drama to the audiences, but the deep work that real therapy entails.

Dr. Orna Guralnik, the couples therapist, meets her patients for the first time when they enter her practice. Her practice features many cameras hidden behind a one-way mirror that surrounds the room. The couples participate in a 20-week therapy program. The one-hour-sessions are recorded, cut for television and edited into nine episodes. The television series is filmed in New York.

There are some rules about the therapy sessions. The couples are not allowed to have any more in-depth discussions about their children, because the children cannot give their consent to the therapy treatment and their life being discussed on television. The couples have no contact with the crew members. They only meet the couples therapist Dr. Orna Guralnik. Dr. Orna Guralnik has a counselor, Virginia Goldner, with whom she discusses the therapy process. In the Covid Special she has another counselor, Dr.  Kirkland Vaughans.

In June 2021, it was announced that there would be a third season of Couples Therapy. It started on May 13, 2022.

Idea and realization 
Director Josh Kriegman came up with the idea for the series. His parents are both psychotherapists. From an early age he had heard a lot about this work. He was fascinated by the therapy processes and what can be achieved by it. He hoped that he would be able to show the therapy process on television. He thought a long time about how this would work in an authentic way.

Along with the directors Eli B. Despres and Elyse Steinberg, Kriegman planned a reality TV series for Showtime.

At first they wanted to find the right therapist. So the production team interviewed a few therapists in New York. They contacted Dr. Orna Guralnik through her Psychoanalytic Institute. At first Guralnik only wanted to be the counselor for the therapist, but after a few discussions with the directors, she decided to be the therapist and not the counselor. It was important to her that the TV series is very close to real therapy instead of relying on dramatization.

The couples of the series were chosen from thousands in a selection process.  The selection processes for each couple took about four months in total. When selecting the couples, it was important to the producers that they had emotional intelligence. They also wanted to find couples who didn't just want to be on TV, but had real problems. The viewers should also be able to identify themselves with the couples. A variety of couples should be shown, who differ in age, sexual orientation, gender identity or ethnicity. The couples should be open to exploring their relationship. Not all couples were shown in the series. For example, they filmed six couples for the first season and only four couples were shown on television.

The therapy room was designed very similar to Dr. Orna Guralnik's own office. The books, the distance between the therapy chair and the couch for the couples were all taken from Guralnik's own office. The cameras were hidden behind one-way mirrors and were placed all around the room so that they could record every corner of the room.

Cast 
 The therapist
 Dr. Orna Guralnik is a psychologist, psychoanalyst, and the couples therapist of the television series. She describes herself as a systemically oriented couples therapist. As such, she does not view a couple as an individual but as a system.

 The counselors
 Dr. Virginia Goldner is the counselor of Dr. Orna Guralnik. Guralnik talks to her about the therapy processes, her own feelings and counter-transferences. Virginia Goldner is a psychoanalyst. As such, she does individual, couples and family therapy. She is also a professor at New York University's postdoctoral program in psychotherapy and psychoanalysis.
 Dr.  Kirkland Vaughans is the counselor of  Dr. Orna Guralnik in the Covid Special. Guralnik contacted him after the murder of George Floyd. Guralniks patients were dealing with their own experiences of racism after hearing of the murder. Vaughans is Professor of Psychology at Adelphi University in New York, Director of the Postgraduate Program in Child and Adolescent Psychotherapy, and Clinical Supervisor at the National Institute for Psychotherapies.

 Peer Advisory Group
 Nuar Alsadir, PhD, LP
 Cynthia Chalker, MSS, LCSW
 Ken Cormbett, PhD
 Kali Cyrus, MD, MPH
 Stephen Hartman, PhD
 Tom Inck, PhD
 Eyal Rozmarin, PhD

The Couples
 Season 1
 Annie & Mau
 Lauren & Sarah
 Evelyn & Alan
 Elaine & DeSean
 Covid Special
 Lauren & Sarah – from Season 1
 Elaine & DeSean – from Season 1
 Lara & Trey
 Michelle & James
 Season 2
 Michael & Michal
 Tashira & Dru
 Matthew & Gianni
 Season 3
 Ping & Wil
 Molly & Josh
 India & Dale
 Cyn & Yaya

Series overview

Season 1 (2019)

The COVID Special (2020)

Season 2 (2021)

Season 3 (2022)

Awards 

TCA Awards
 2021: TCA Award for Outstanding Achievement in Reality Programming

International versions 
On July 26, 2022, the Australian streaming portal Paramount+ began airing a series of the same name. The psychotherapist is Marryam Chehelnabi. Her therapeutic work is based on the therapy methods of John Gottman. Chehelnabi's supervisor is Lea Crisante. The second season of the series is scheduled to air in November 2022.

See also
 List of programs broadcast by Showtime

References

External links
 

2019 American television series debuts
2010s American reality television series
2020s American reality television series
Showtime (TV network) original programming